The Sherborne Missal (London, British Library, Add MS 74236) is an early 15th-century English illuminated manuscript missal, one of the finest English examples of International Gothic painting. It has survived in excellent condition, and is usually on display at the Ritblat Gallery in the British Library. It has been described as "beyond question the most spectacular service
book of English execution to have come down to us from the later Middle Ages."

The Sherborne Missal was commissioned by Robert Bruyning, who served as abbot at the Abbey of St Mary in Sherborne in Dorset from 1385 to 1415. It was made for use at the abbey sometime between 1399 and 1407. The main scribe was a Benedictine monk of Sherborne Abbey, John Whas. Several hands worked on the illumination but the main artist was John Siferwas, a Dominican friar. Both of them, alongside Bruyning and his superior the Bishop of Salisbury Richard Mitford, are depicted and named in numerous miniatures.

The marginal decorations contain numerous high-quality drawings of British birds, including cormorants, gannets, moorhens, storks, European robins, chaffinches and mallards. Over a hundred leaves portray Bruyning. Saint Wulfsige is also depicted, welcoming Benedictine monks into the chapel, marking the 998 move of the bishop's see from Sherborne to Salisbury via Old Sarum. Given that the scribes were thus aware of the church's history, it is likely that the missal was commissioned to commemorate Bruyning's career, but also to promote the building's history, and reinforce the public image of the church in general. Bruyning was most likely motivated by a desire to enhance Sherborne's reputation in a bid to attain funds for construction. In particular he wanted to rebuild the monks' choir; more generally he wanted to modernise what was then a largely 12th-century building. Surviving records indicate that Bruyning undertook this task with vigour.

In 1998 the Sherborne Missal was bought by the British Library from Ralph Percy, 12th Duke of Northumberland.

See also
 List of most expensive books and manuscripts

Notes

References

Janet Backhouse, The Sherborne Missal. Toronto: University of Toronto Press, 1999. 
Janet Backhouse, Medieval Birds in the Sherborne Missal. Toronto: University of Toronto Press, 2001. 
Kenneth Clark, Animals and Men. London: Thames and Hudson, 1977. 
Michelle P. Brown The Sherborne Missal, Turning the Pages CD-Rom . London: British Library, 2002.
Linda Monckton, "The Late Medieval Rebuilding of Sherborne Abbey: A Reassessment". Architectural History''', Volume 43, 2000. 

Michelle P. Brown "The Sherborne Missal and ‘Roddoke Robertus’: the Anatomy of a Major Manuscript Commission", in 'The Medieval Book: Glosses from Friends and Colleagues of Christopher de Hamel', ed. by R. A. Linenthal, J. H. Marrow & W. G. Noel .Houten: Hes and de Graaf, 2010.
Alexander Collins, "Miniaturizing Mary: The Microarchitecture of Embodiment in the Sherborne Missal", in Jean-Marie Guillouët and Ambre Vilain (eds.), Microarchitectures médiévales. L'échelle à l'épreuve de la matière'', Paris, INHA/Picard, 2018.

External links
View the full digitised manuscript on the British Library's Universal Viewer
A selection of 32 digitised pages on the British Library's Online gallery of sacred texts
BBC – Dorset – "The Sherborne Missal". 12 August 2005 (Retrieved 15 July 2008)
"Digitisation of the Sherborne Missal", The British Library Medieval manuscripts blog, 27 August 2020 (retrieved 14 September 2020)

British Library additional manuscripts
15th-century illuminated manuscripts
Illuminated missals